Guillain may refer to:

People 

 Georges Guillain (1876–1961), French neurologist
 Gilles Guillain (born 1982), Colombian-born French actor
 Robert Guillain (1908–1998), French journalist and author of several books on Japan

Medical 

 Guillain–Barré syndrome, an acute polyneuropathy, a disorder affecting the peripheral nervous system
 Triangle of Guillain-Mollaret, the myoclonic triangle,  an important feedback circuit of the brainstem

See also

 Guillan (disambiguation)